Clarius can refer to:

Apollo, Greek and Roman God
also known as Apollo Clarius, see Clarus
Clarius, a small stream in Cyprus which ran near the town of Aepeia (Cyprus).
Clarius also means "more brightly" in Latin
Clarius or Pseudo-Clarius, monk once thought to be the author of the Chronicle of Saint-Pierre-le-Vif of Sens
Isidorus Clarius, religious scholar
Birgit Clarius, German heptathlete
Clarius, a planet in the Clyph star system of the Milky Way Galaxy in the Marvel Universe (see Features of the Marvel Universe)

See also
Clarus (disambiguation)
Clarias, fish family